"Orasaadha" is a 2018 song composed and performed by Vivek–Mervin (a duo of Vivek Siva and Mervin Solomon) and lyrics written by Ku. Karthik for the platform 7up Madras Gig. Released on 7th June 2018, the song received viral response from the audiences and listeners and became one of the non-film hit songs in 2018.

Background 
"Orasaadha" was the maiden independent song for Vivek and Mervin after working as music engineer and programmer for Anirudh Ravichander and their foray in films with Vadacurry, Pugazh, Dora and Gulaebaghavali. In an interview with Srinivasa Ramanujam of The Hindu, the duo stated that the song is about a youngster's first love, which falls in the new-age electropop genre, which was a challenging attempt since Vivek and Mervin were belonging to different musical backgrounds - the former is about Carnatic music and the latter's revolve around Gospel and Western classical tracks, and there were different musical influences when they collaborate together.

Music video 
The music video for this song was shot at Knack Studios' special arena Studio Gigs, where the team allowed to shoot most of the songs for the online platform. Amith Krishnan directed the music video whereas Vijay Kartik Kannan filmed the visuals. Anusha Swamy and Suren Rajendran appeared in this song apart from doing the choreography.

Reception 
The song became an instant hit upon its release on 7 June 2018. Major praise from listeners and music critics pointed the electro pop genre for this song, apart from the composer's usual nuances of music genre. The music video of this song crossed more than 82 million views in YouTube. The success of the number prompted the duo to create more of independent songs, with two of the songs "Gaandu Kannamma" and "Pakkam Neeyum Illai" were released through the same label Sony Music.

Orasaadha was listed in their Ten Tamil Romantic Songs of 2018 by The New Indian Express, which is one of the two non-film singles being included in the list; the second one is "Bodhai Kodhai" composed by Karthik. Both the artists performed on a special stage performance telecasted on Jaya TV on 13 September 2018 during the occasion of Vinayagar Chathurthi, and also at the Behindwoods Gold Mic Awards held in December 2019, where it marked the first live stage performance for the duo. They also bagged the award for Best Independent Music at the ceremony.

Credits 
Credits adapted from Sony Music South

 Composed by: Vivek-Mervin
 Vocals: Mervin Solomon & Vivek Siva
 Lyrics: Ku. Karthik
 Music Produced & Arranged by Vivek-Mervin
 Recording Engineers: Sachin, Shervin
 Mixed by Vivek Siva @ VM Labs, Chennai
 Mastered by Shadab Rayeen @ New Edge Studios, Mumbai

References

External links 

 

Tamil-language songs
2018 songs
Tamil music